The 2011 Formula Pilota China season is the first season of the newly created Formula Pilota China series, which ran on regulations based on Formula Abarth. The championship began on 3 July at Guangdong and was finished on 27 November at Sepang after twelve races held at six meetings. Also series had non-championship round that held on 3 December at Sepang.

9 teams fielded 26 drivers during the whole tour.

Swiss-French driver, who participated under Czech racing license Mathéo Tuscher became the first Formula Pilota China Champion with 189 points after scoring nine podium finishes from twelve races with eight wins. His nearest competitor, Luis Sá Silva, took two wins during the whole season and managed second overall with 124 points. Third place went to Indonesian driver Dustin Sofyan, who also took Best Asian Driver Trophy.

Teams and drivers
 All cars are FPT-engined Tatuus FA010 chassis.

Race calendar and results
The series' provisional schedule was released on 3 March 2011. Latterly, the calendar was almost totally revised. Rounds in Zhuhai was dropped in favor of Shanghai Tianma, also series had non-championship round at Sepang.

Standings
Points were awarded as follows:

‡ Round at Sepang was non-championship, no points awarded.
Only eleven best results were count towards the year-end standings.

Best Asian Driver Trophy

References

External links

Formula Masters China seasons
Formula Pilota China
Formula Pilota China
Pilota China